Waddon Ponds is an ornamental  urban park / inland water in the western part of the London Borough of Croydon, by whom it is managed. It is bordered to the north by Mill Lane, and on the other three sides by Waddon Court Road, Court Drive and The Ridgeway.

History
Waddon Ponds is one of very few sites in Croydon where the River Wandle can be seen above ground. Nearby, Wandle Park contains a rivercourse, released from its culvert in 2012. The ponds formed one of the sources of the river, which initially rises at South Croydon, and originally flowed north-west through the grounds of the Archbishops of Canterbury at Croydon Palace before reaching a millpond on the northern side of Mill Lane; opposite the current (2021) site of Waddon Ponds. The ponds themselves are fed by springs occurring at the junction of sand and chalk beds with London gravel beds.

The Domesday Book makes reference to a mill at the northern extent of the pond used for grinding corn and when adjacent housing was created in the early 20th-century, Iron Age and Bronze Age artefacts were found. The river had been dammed to form a lake at the northern end but was diverted at the end of the 19th-century and the drained land was used to grow watercress and subsequently given over to light industry. A mill was still in existence in 1928 when it closed down. At the same point, and following a campaign by a Mr. Pescot Row, a writer on themes of natural beauty, Croydon Corporation bought part of both Waddon Court Farm and Waddon Lodge, subsequent to the deaths of both owners. A sundial was donated to the ponds in acknowledgement of Row's efforts.

Bwtween 2012 and 2017, Croydon Council undertook work to the park to change its type from an ornamental park to a more natural wetland. In particular the banks were graded to provide a gentle slope into the water rather than the boarded edges which existed previously.

The Wandle Trail, which loosely follows the course of the river from Croydon to Wandsworth, runs through the park.

Facilities 
In addition to the ponds themselves, the park contains a children's playground and toilets. At the south-eastern  corner there is an ornamental garden.

From the main entrance, at the north-east corner, a path leads right round the ponds, with bridges at the points where the ponds split into two separate areas of water, finishing at the north-west corner, where the playground is sited and there is a further entrance. There are also entrances from Waddon Court Road.

See also
 List of parks and open spaces in Croydon
 Croydon parks and open spaces

Gallery

References

External links 
 Waddon Ponds at London Gardens Trust
 Waddon ponds at Wandle Valley Park website
 Waddon Ponds at Ordnance Survey Get Outside website

Parks and open spaces in the London Borough of Croydon
Urban public parks in the United Kingdom
1928 establishments in England